Johan Willem van Zegeren (born 7 December 1990) is a Dutch basketball player for CB San Pablo Burgos of the LEB Oro and the Netherlands national basketball team.

Early career
Born in Gweru, Zimbabwe, he moved to the Netherlands when he was 8 and grew up in Hoogeveen, Drenthe. After playing in the youth program of Rotterdam Basketbal and made his debut for the first team in the Dutch Basketball League in the 2009–10 season, playing 9 games. He later moved to Spain to play in the Canarias Basketball Academy program.

College career
Van Zegeren played four seasons with Virginia Tech. As a redshirt junior, he averaged 9.8 points and 5.3 rebounds per game, but was dismissed from the team in January 2015. For his final season of eligibility, van Zegeren transferred to Northwestern. He averaged 3.6 points and 3.0 rebounds per game, suffering a season-ending knee injury in March 2015.

Professional career
He spent the 2018-19 season with Oviedo CB, averaging 7.2 points and 5.2 rebounds per game. On June 15, 2019, van Zegeren signed with AB Castelló. In July 2020, van Zegeren signed with Real Valladolid.

On August 9, 2022, he has signed with San Pablo Burgos of the LEB Oro.

National team career
In January 2020, he was selected for the Netherlands national basketball team for the first time.

References

External links
Northwestern Wildcats bio
Virginia Tech Hokies bio

1990 births
Living people
AB Castelló players
CB Miraflores players
Dutch Basketball League players
Dutch expatriate basketball people in Germany
Dutch expatriate basketball people in Spain
Dutch expatriate basketball people in the United States
Dutch men's basketball players
Feyenoord Basketball players
Leuven Bears players
Northwestern Wildcats men's basketball players
Oviedo CB players
Virginia Tech Hokies men's basketball players